The 2012 Open Castilla y León was a professional tennis tournament played on hard courts. It was the 27th edition of the tournament which was part of the Tretorn SERIE+ of the 2012 ATP Challenger Tour. It took place in Segovia, Spain between 21 and 27 August 2012.

ATP entrants

Seeds

 1 Rankings are as of August 13, 2012.

Other entrants
The following players received wildcards into the singles main draw:
  Andrés Artuñedo Martínavarr
  Carlos Benito Hergueta
  Jorge Hernando Ruano
  Ricardo Villacorta-Alonso

The following players received entry from the qualifying draw:
  Marin Draganja
  Cătălin-Ionuț Gârd
  Nikolaus Moser
  Luca Vanni

Champions

Singles

 Evgeny Donskoy def.  Albano Olivetti, 6–1, 7–6(13–11)

Doubles

 Stefano Ianni /  Florin Mergea def.  Konstantin Kravchuk /  Nikolaus Moser, 6–2, 6–3

External links
Official Website
ITF Search
ATP official site

 
Castilla
Castilla y Leon
Open Castilla y Leon
Open Castilla y León